Ms. Lekha Tharoor Kanunnathu is a 2013 Indian Malayalam-language psychological horror film  produced by K. K. Suresh Chandran and directed by Shajiyem.

The film is an adaptation of the 2002 Hong Kong film The Eye. The movie features Meera Jasmine, Badri, Suraj Venjarammoodu, Nandhu, Geetha Vijayan and Shankar Panicker. The movie was later dubbed into Tamil as Kangal Irandal and in Telugu as Eyes.

Plot
TV host Lekha Tharoor unexpectedly begins experiencing disturbing, violent visions. After explaining her mental state to friends and colleagues, she is presumed psychotic and is referred to a psychiatric hospital for treatment.

Cast
 Meera Jasmine as Lekha Tharoor
 Badri as Dr. Alex
 Shankar Panicker as Village Doctor
 Suraj Venjarammoodu as Camera Operator
 Nandhu as Nandagopalan Nair
 Geetha Vijayan as Muthulakshmi
 Nilambur Ayisha
 Sunil Sukhada
 Krishna
 Jose
 Rosin Jolly as Veni
 Asha Aravind
 Arun Ghosh

Production

Meera Jasmine, who began reappearing in films by late-2012 after a brief break, plays the lead role in the film. Shajiyem had the actress in mind when he was developing the character, saying: "When she heard the story, she readily agreed to take the role and we eagerly awaited her available dates." Badri, who was one of the heroes in Mamas' Cinema Company (2012), plays the male lead.

The film is set in the city of Kochi, and was filmed in Kochi, Pollachi and Palakkad. Shooting ended in late May 2013.

See also
 List of Malayalam horror films

References

External links
 

2013 films
2010s psychological horror films
2010s Malayalam-language films
Films shot in Kochi
Films shot in Pollachi
Films shot in Palakkad
Films shot in Kerala
Indian psychological horror films
Indian remakes of Hong Kong films